Football Federation of Dnipropetrovsk Oblast (FFDO) is a football governing body in the region of Dnipropetrovsk Oblast, Ukraine. The federation is a member of the Regional Council of FFU and the collective member of the FFU itself.

Previous Champions

1936    FC Avanhard Melitopol
1937    FC Avanhard Melitopol (2)
1938    FC Stal Dniprodzerzhynsk
1939    FC Stal Kryvyi Rih
1940-44 World War II
1945    FC Stal Dniprodzerzhynsk (2)
1946    FC Stal Dniprodzerzhynsk (3)
1947    FC Stal Dniprodzerzhynsk (4)
1948    FC Stal Dniprodzerzhynsk (5)
1949    FC Metalurh Dniprodzerzhynsk (6)
1950    Dzerzhynets (7) & Metalurh
1951    FC Trud Dnipropetrovsk
1952    FC Trud Dnipropetrovsk (2)
1953    FC Khimik-ZShU Dniprodzerzhynsk
1954    FC Khimik-ZShU Dniprodzerzhynsk (2)
1955    Liebknecht Mine Kryvyi Rih
1956    ???
1957    FC Avanhard Terny
1958    FC Avanhard Zhovti Vody
1959    BKKhZ Dniprodzerzhynsk
1960    FC Metalurh Nikopol (2)
1961    FC Trubnyk Nikopol (3)
1962    FC Avanhard Dnipropetrovsk
1963    FC Avanhard Ordzhonikidze
1964    ???
1965    FC Avanhard Terny
1966    FC Meteor Dnipropetrovsk
1967    FC Avanhard Vilnohirsk
1968    FC Avanhard Vilnohirsk (2)
1969    FC Avanhard Ordzhonikidze
1970    FC Avanhard Kryvyi Rih
1971    FC Avanhard Vilnohirsk (3)
1972    FC Silhosptekhnika Nikopol
1973    FC Avanhard Vilnohirsk (4)
1974    FC Vykhor Dnipropetrovsk
1975    FC Kolos Nikopol (2)
1976    ZKL Dnipropetrovsk
1977    ???
1978    FC Metalurh Dniprodzerzhynsk (8)
1979    FC Vykhor Dnipropetrovsk (2)
1980    FC Vykhor Dnipropetrovsk (3)
1981    FC Vykhor Dnipropetrovsk (4)
1982    FC Hirnyk Pavlohrad
1983    FC Metal Dnipropetrovsk
1984    FC Tytan Vilnohirsk
1985    FC Avanhard Ordzhonikidze (2)
1986    FC Hirnyk Pavlohrad (2)
1987    FC Metal Dnipropetrovsk (2)
1988    FC Metalurh Dniprodzerzhynsk (9)
1989    FC Avanhard Zhovti Vody (2)
1990    FC Metalurh Kryvyi Rih
1991    FC Press Dnipropetrovsk
=independence of Ukraine=
1992    FC Metalurh Dniprodzerzhynsk (10)
1992-93 FC Metalurh Novomoskovsk
1993-94 FC Metalurh Kryvyi Rih (2)
1994-95 FC Zirka-Dnipro Novomoskovsk
1995    FC Budivelnyk Kryvyi Rih
1996    FC Druzhba Mahdalynivka
1997    FC Ahrovest Novooleksandrivka
1998    FC Metal Dnipropetrvosk (3)
1999    FC Metal Dnipropetrvosk (4)
2000    FC Metal Dnipropetrovsk (5)
2001    FC Hirnyk Kryvyi Rih (2)
2002    FC Hirnyk Kryvyi Rih (3)
2003    PK Dniprovsky Nikopol
2004    FC Kolos Chkalove
2005    FC Kolos Chkalove (2)
2006    FC Kolos Chkalove (3)
2007    FC Atlant Kryvyi Rih
2008    FC Avio Dnipropetrovsk
2009    FC Fakel Petrykivka
2010    FC Kolos Chkalove (4)
2011    FC Kolos Chkalove (5)
2012    FC Kolos Chkalove (6)
2013    UVD Dnipropetrovsk
2014    FC VPK-Ahro Shevchenkivka
2015    FC Lozuvatka
2016    FC VPK-Ahro Shevchenkivka (2)
2017    FC Kryvyi Rih
2018    FC VPK-Ahro Shevchenkivka (3)
2019    FC Skoruk Tomakivka
2020-21 FC Skoruk Tomakivka

Top winners
10 - FC Stal (Metalurh) Dniprodzerzhynsk
 6 - FC Kolos Chkalove
 5 - FC Metal Dnipropetrovsk
 4 - FC Avanhard Vilnohirsk
 4 - FC Vykhor Dnipropetrovsk
 3 - 4 clubs (Trubnyk (Metalurh), Avanhard O., Hirnyk (Liebknecht Mine), VPK-Ahro)
 2 - 9 clubs
 1 - 20 clubs

Professional clubs
 FC Dynamo Dnipropetrovsk, 1936-1937, 1946
 FC Stal – Lenin Factory Dniprpetrovsk, 1936 (two seasons)
 FC Lokomotiv Dnipropetrovsk, 1937, 1967-1969
 FC Dnipro (Stal – Petrovsky Factory, Metallurg), 1937, 1939, 1946-1949, 1953-2018

 FC Spartak Dnipropetrovsk, 1946
 SC Prometei Dniprodzerzhynsk (Khimik, Dneprovets), 1957-1970
 FC Kryvbas Kryvyi Rih (Kryvyi Rih, Avangard, Gornyak), 1959-2013

 FC Sirius Zhovti Vody (Avangard), 1960-1970, 1993-1995
 FC Trubnik Nikopol, 1962-1970
 FC Stal Dnipropetrovsk, 1967
 FC Elektrometalurh-NZF Nikopol (Kolos, Metalurh), 1976-2005
 FC Stal Kamianske (Metalurh), 1979-1985, 2001-2018
 FC Kosmos Pavlohrad (Kolos, Shakhtar), 1981-1996
 FC Prometei Dniprodzerzhynsk, 1992-1993, 1995-1996 (two seasons)
 FC Metalurh Novomoskovsk, 1994-1999
 FC Sportinvest Kryvyi Rih, 1995-1996 (single season)
 FC Hirnyk Pavlohrad, 1997-1998 (single season)
 FC Hirnyk Kryvyi Rih, 2004-2016
 FC Dnipro-75 Dnipropetrovsk, 2008-2010 (two seasons)
 FC Nikopol (Makiivvuhillia Makiivka), 2015-2021
 SC Dnipro-1, 2017-
 FC VPK-Ahro Shevchenkivka, 2019-2021
 FC Peremoha Dnipro, 2020-2021
 FC Kryvbas Kryvyi Rih (2020) (Hirnyk), 2018-
 FC Skoruk Tomakivka, 2021-

See also
 FFU Council of Regions

References

External links
 Malyshev, Yu. Amateur forge of champions (Аматорська кузня чемпіонів). Football Federation of Ukraine. 29 June 2010
 Football Federation of Dnipropetrovsk Oblast website
 History of regional tournaments of Russia in football. Dnipropetrovsk Oblast of the Ukrainian SSR (история региональных турниров России по футболу. Днепропетровская область Украинской ССР). regional-football.ru.

Dnipropetrovsk 
Dnipropetrovsk 
Football in Dnipropetrovsk Oblast